Pratomysia was a Roman town of ancient Bithynia. Its name does not occur in ancient authors but is inferred from epigraphic and other evidence.

Its site is located near Gacık, Asiatic Turkey.

References

Populated places in Bithynia
Former populated places in Turkey
History of Yalova Province
Roman towns and cities in Turkey